Infected is a 2008 Canadian made-for-television Action adventure science-fiction horror-thriller film, which was directed by Adam Weissman. The movie has been given extremely negative reviews by critics and criticized by local television viewers for its B-movie/Z-movie-style elements and low-grade cinematography, extremely cheap budget, lack of coherence, and fast-paced and improper storytelling. The film however, has developed a strong cult following among Google users who have seen the film. The film received an R-rating from the MPAA before its scheduled release in the United States in 2009.

Cast
 Gil Bellows as Ben
 Maxim Roy	as Lisa
 Glenda Braganza as Connie
 Mark Camacho as Craig Braddock
 Bruce Dinsmore as Peter Whitefield
 Carlo Mestroni as Captain Wimmer
 Neil Napier as Taylor Lambert
 Judd Nelson as Malcolm Burgess
 Donny Quinn as Obsequious Assistant (as Donny Falsetti)
 Isabella Rossellini as Carla Plume
 David Schaap as Lowe
 Jesse Todd as Knutt Jourgensen

Production
The project was filmed in Montreal, Quebec, Canada under the working title The Hatching. The title was later changed to Infected, however this caused problems. A novel by writer Scott Sigler, with the same name Infected, had to have its book title changed to Infested, in order to prevent confusion, and a false copyright infringement/plagiarism penalty.

Release
It aired on 27 April 2008 on the SciFi channel. Genius Productions and Rhi Entertainment released the film Direct-to-DVD and VOD on 19 May 2009 in the United States. 
The film later received a limited online streaming release on Netflix, in 2011 and was given moderately positive reviews.

Soundtrack
Ned Bouhalassa composed the score and worked on the Soundtrack with drummer Christian Olsen.

References

External links
 

2008 television films
2008 films
2000s adventure films
2000s science fiction horror films
2000s science fiction thriller films
Canadian science fiction horror films
Canadian science fiction television films
Canadian science fiction thriller films
English-language Canadian films
Films about viral outbreaks
Canadian horror television films
2000s Canadian films